"Sweet Merilee" is a song by American rock musician Donnie Iris from his 1981 album King Cool. The song was released as a single and reached #80 on the Billboard Hot 100 charts and #31 on the U.S. Billboard Mainstream Rock Tracks charts.

Charts

References

External links
Lyrics

Donnie Iris songs
1981 singles
Songs written by Mark Avsec
1981 songs
Songs written by Donnie Iris
MCA Records singles